Leopoldine Konstantin (born Leopoldine Eugenie Amelie Konstanti; 12 March 1886 – 14 December 1965) was an Austrian actress. She played in Frank Wedekind's Spring Awakening (1907), Shakespeare's Romeo and Juliet (1907), A Winter's Tale (1908), and A Midsummer Night's Dream (1910).

Early life
Leopoldine Konstantin was born as Leopoldine Eugenie Amelie Konstanti on 12 March 1886 in Moravia, Austria-Hungary. She made her debut in the Deutsches Theater in Berlin in 1907. From 1911 she was to be found at the Kammerspiele in Berlin and became known in the Berlin salons. She moved to Vienna in 1916 and by 1924 she was playing the title role in Friedrich Schiller's Mary Stuart.

Career

Starting in 1912 she also played in silent films, initially in title roles. She turned away from this medium when, after the First World War, she was offered increasingly minor parts. In 1923 she had a house built in Westerland for herself and her son Alexander. 

From 1933 she returned to film work, and in 1935 she returned to Austria. In that same year she moved to the United States via Britain. She spoke no English at that time, and had to take a job as a factory worker until, after intensive language study, she landed a supporting role in Alfred Hitchcock's 1946 film Notorious, in which she played Claude Rains' mother, although she was only three years older than him.

Personal life
Konstantin took acting lessons with Alexander Strakosch, whom she married shortly afterwards in 1906. They divorced in 1924. In the same year, she married Hungarian counsellor and author Géza Herczeg, and had a son, Alexander. They divorced in 1938.

Later years and death
She performed in two television series in 1948 and returned to Vienna. Her last acting work involved sporadic theatre roles and poetry readings on the radio. She died on 14 December 1965 in Hietzing, Vienna, Austria at the age of 79.

Filmography

1910: Sumurûn - Tänzerin
1912: Gebannt und erlöst (Banned and redeemed) (Short)
1912: Die Heldin der schwarzen Berge (The Heroine of the Black Mountains)
1913: Schuldig - Tochter Julia Lehr
1913: Die Insel der Seligen (The Isle of the Blessed) - Circe
1913: Ultimo - Gouvernante
1913: Die Hand des Schicksals (The Hand of Fate)
1913: Vater und Sohn (Father and Son) (Short)
1914: Maria Magdalena - Klara, Anton's Tochter
1914: Verhängnisvolles Glück
1914: Kleine weiße Sklaven (Little White Slaves) - Schwester Luise Sanden
1915: Der Dolch im Strumpfband
1915: Die zerbrochene Puppe (The Smashed Doll) (Short)
1915: The Dancer
1916: Das Wiegenlied (The Lullaby)
1916: Der Radiumraub - Räuberin
1917: Aus vergessenen Akten (From Forgotten Files) - Täterin
1917: The Onyx Head - Geliebte von Deebs
1917: Eine Nacht in der Stahlkammer - Kunstschützin Celestine
1918: Der Volontär
1918: Lola Montez - Lola Montez
1919: Der Volontär (The Volunteer) - A táncosnõ
1919: Lilli's Marriage - Suse
1919: Der Verrat der Gräfin Leonie (The Betrayal of Countess Leonie)
1920: Können Gedanken töten? (Can Thoughts Kill?) - Frau Luda
1920: Christian Wahnschaffe 
1920: Der Shawl der Kaiserin Katharina II (The Shawl of Empress Catherine II)
1920: President Barrada
1921: Der Silberkönig (The Silver King)
1932: Ein toller Einfall 
1933: Season in Cairo - Ellinor Blackwell
1934: A Precocious Girl - Maria, her mother
1934: Es tut sich was um Mitternacht (It's happening at midnight) - Frau Dr. Wegener
1934: Liebe dumme Mama - Helene Burkardt
1934: Princess Turandot - Kaiserin
1935: The Old and the Young King - Königin Sophie Dorothee
1935: Fresh Wind from Canada - Frau Olden
1936: Mädchenpensionat - Fräulein Leers
1937: Und du, mein Schatz, fährst mit (And you, my darling, go with them) - Donna Juana de Villafranca
1937: Another World - Lady Brandmore
1946: Notorious - Madame Anna Sebastian

Gallery

References

External links

1886 births
1965 deaths
20th-century Austrian actresses
Austrian film actresses
Austrian silent film actresses
Austrian stage actresses